Bahmer is a town in the Sahara Desert of Southern central Algeria, the Adrar Province.

The town was used as a base in October 2009 by the BBC Human Planet team for a film about the Foggara, also known as Qanat well systems, with the support of Prepare2go.

Populated places in Adrar Province